Shanyn MacEachern (born 17 February 1980) is a Canadian gymnast. She competed at the 1996 Summer Olympics.

References

External links
 

1980 births
Living people
Canadian female artistic gymnasts
Olympic gymnasts of Canada
Gymnasts at the 1996 Summer Olympics
Sportspeople from Brampton